Studyonoye is a rural locality (a village) in Opokskoye Rural Settlement, Velikoustyugsky District, Vologda Oblast, Russia. The population was 15 as of 2002.

Geography 
Studyonoye is located 56 km southwest of Veliky Ustyug (the district's administrative centre) by road. Priluki is the nearest rural locality.

References 

Rural localities in Velikoustyugsky District